Ogongo Constituency is an electoral constituency in the Omusati Region northern part of Namibia. It had 18,498 inhabitants in 2004 and 9,140 registered voters . Its district capital is the settlement of Ogongo. The constituency further contains the settlements of Eengolo, Eendombe, Pyamukuyu, Iipanda, Ombathi, and Omuthitu.

University of Namibia has one of its agricultural campuses near Ogongo, which specialisies in crop science and forestry.

Politics
As in all constituencies in Omusati, SWAPO won the 2015 regional election by a landslide. Wilhelm Iiyambo gained 4,392 votes, while Josua Nghishiikoh of the Rally for Democracy and Progress (RDP) gained only 45. The SWAPO candidate won the 2020 regional election by a large margin. Daniel Iilende obtained 3,703 votes, followed by independent candidate Johannes Nakale with 245 votes and Tataati Komya of the Independent Patriots for Change (IPC), an opposition party formed in August 2020, with 149 votes.

References

Constituencies of Omusati Region
States and territories established in 1992
1992 establishments in Namibia